Methylorhabdus  is a genus of Gram-negative bacteria. Up to now there is only one species of this genus known (Methylorhabdus multivorans)

References

 

Hyphomicrobiales
Monotypic bacteria genera
Bacteria genera